This is a list of school districts in the United States ranked by 2018 enrollment.

Previously Listed Schools

References

External links 
 100 largest school districts, by enrollment size, from the United States Department of Education (2004-05 school year)
 List of largest school districts from ProximityOne.com
 A list of the 500 largest school districts in 2000–2001 from the National Center for Education Statistics (Department of Education)
 100 largest school districts, by enrollment size, from the United States Department of Education (2010-11 school year)
 120 largest school districts, by enrollment size, from the United States Department of Education (2017-18 school year)

School districts in the United States
School districts
School districts in the United States